Jeong-sik, also spelled Jung-sik or Jong-sik, is a Korean masculine given name. Its meaning differs based on the hanja used to write each syllable of the name.  There are 65 hanja with the reading "jeong" and 16 hanja with the reading "sik" on the South Korean government's official list of hanja which may be registered for use in given names.

Notable people with the name include:
 Kim Jeong-sik (1902–1934), pen name Kim Sowol, Korean poet of the Japanese colonial period
 Moon Jung-sik (1930–2006), South Korean football player and manager
 Cho Jeong-sik (born 1963), South Korean politician
 Lee Jeong-sik (born 1963), South Korean gymnast
 Park Jung-sik (born 1983), South Korean football defender
 Lee Jung-sik (born 1995), South Korean actor and model
 Park Jung-sik (footballer, born 1988), South Korean football midfielder
 Won Jeong-sik (born 1990), South Korean weightlifter

See also
List of Korean given names
An Jung-sik (1861–1919), Joseon Dynasty writer, whose given name is spelled differently in hangul

References

Korean masculine given names